László Balogh (born 14 April 1951) is a Hungarian rower. He competed in the men's coxless pair event at the 1972 Summer Olympics.

References

1951 births
Living people
Hungarian male rowers
Olympic rowers of Hungary
Rowers at the 1972 Summer Olympics
Sportspeople from Győr